Bülent Uzun (born 21 November 1990) is a Turkish professional professional footballer who plays as a left-back for TFF First League club Eyüpspor. He is not to be confused with Turkish football referee Bülent Uzun.

Career
Uzun played between 2003 and 2008 as a part of Beşiktaş PAF, the youth section of Beşiktaş, until he was promoted to senior team by head coach Jean Tigana. Uzun made his Süper Lig debut at match-week 19 of 2007–08 season up against Kasımpaşa, as a subbed in player in loss time, on 19 January 2008. In the following weeks, he rather stayed in the bench.

References

External links
 

1990 births
Living people
Turkish footballers
Turkey youth international footballers
Beşiktaş J.K. footballers
Yeni Malatyaspor footballers
Association football defenders
Sportspeople from Rize
Kasımpaşa S.K. footballers
Kocaelispor footballers
Eyüpspor footballers
Aydınspor footballers
Maltepespor footballers
Darıca Gençlerbirliği footballers
Tuzlaspor players
TFF First League players
Süper Lig players
TFF Second League players
TFF Third League players